The Sani Abacha Stadium is a multi-purpose stadium in Kano, Kano State, Nigeria. It is mostly used for football matches and athletics. The stadium is the home of NPFL side Kano Pillars F.C. The stadium has a capacity of 16,000 and is named after the deceased former military Head of State, General Sani Abacha.

The Sani Abacha Stadium has hosted several international competitions including the 2000 African Cup of Nations and the 2009 FIFA U-17 World Cup.

During the 2017 NPFL season, Kano Pillars drew an average home attendance of 10,000 the highest ever recorded in the Nigerian league.

Football tournaments hosted

1999 FIFA World Youth Championship

2000 African Cup of Nations

2009 FIFA U-17 World Cup

References

External links
 worldstadiums.com

Football venues in Nigeria
Buildings and structures in Kano
Multi-purpose stadiums in Nigeria